This list of giant squid specimens and sightings is a comprehensive timeline of recorded human encounters with members of the genus Architeuthis, popularly known as giant squid. It includes animals that were caught by fishermen, found washed ashore, recovered (in whole or in part) from sperm whales and other predatory species, as well as those reliably sighted at sea. The list also covers specimens incorrectly assigned to the genus Architeuthis in original descriptions or later publications.

Background

History of discovery 
Tales of giant squid have been common among mariners since ancient times, but the animals were long considered mythical and often associated with the kraken of Nordic legend. The giant squid did not gain widespread scientific acceptance until specimens became available to zoologists in the second half of the 19th century, beginning with the formal naming of Architeuthis dux by Japetus Steenstrup in 1857, from fragmentary Bahamian material collected two years earlier (#14 on this list). In the same work, Steenstrup also named a second species, Architeuthis monachus, based on a preserved beak, the only part saved from a carcass that washed ashore in Denmark in 1853  (#13). The giant squid came to public prominence in 1861 when the French corvette Alecton encountered a live animal (#18) at the surface while navigating near Tenerife. A report of the incident filed by the ship's captain was almost certainly seen by Jules Verne and adapted by him for the description of the monstrous squid in Twenty Thousand Leagues Under the Sea.

The giant squid's existence was established beyond doubt only in the 1870s, with the appearance of an extraordinary number of complete specimens—both dead and alive—in Newfoundland waters (beginning with #21). These were meticulously documented in a series of papers by Yale zoologist Addison Emery Verrill. Two of these Newfoundland specimens, both from 1873, were particularly significant as they were among the earliest to be photographed: first a single severed tentacle—hacked off a live animal as it "attacked" a fishing boat (#29)—and weeks later an intact animal in two parts (#30). The head and limbs of this latter specimen were famously shown draped over the sponge bath of Moses Harvey, a local clergyman, essayist, and amateur naturalist. Harvey secured and reported widely on both of these important specimens—as well as numerous others (most notably the Catalina specimen of 1877; #42)—and it was largely through his efforts that giant squid became known to North American and British zoologists. Recognition of Architeuthis as a real animal led to the reappraisal of earlier reports of gigantic tentacled sea creatures, with some of these subsequently being accepted as records of giant squid, the earliest stretching back to at least the 17th century.

For a time in the late 19th century, almost every major specimen of which material was saved was described as a new species. In all, some twenty species names were coined. However, there is no widely agreed basis for distinguishing between the named species, and both morphological and genetic data point to the existence of a single, globally distributed species, which according to the principle of priority must be known by the earliest available name: Architeuthis dux.

It is not known why giant squid become stranded on shore, but it may be because the distribution of deep, cold water where they live is temporarily altered. Marine biologist and Architeuthis specialist Frederick Aldrich proposed that there may be a periodicity to the strandings around Newfoundland, and based on historical data suggested an average interval between mass strandings of some 30 years. Aldrich used this value to correctly predict a relatively small stranding event between 1964 and 1966 (beginning with #169). The appearance of specimens around New Zealand has been linked to the El Niño–Southern Oscillation, with multiple strandings in the Cook Strait in 1879–1880 (beginning with #47) and 1982–1984 coinciding with or immediately following extreme negative peaks of the Southern Oscillation Index. Although strandings continue to occur sporadically throughout the world, few have been as frequent as those in Newfoundland in the late 19th century. A notable exception was a 15-month period between 2014 and 2015, during which an unprecedented 57 specimens were recorded from Japanese coastal waters of the Sea of Japan (beginning with #563).

Though the total number of recorded giant squid specimens now runs into the hundreds, the species remains notoriously elusive and little known. Attempts to capture a glimpse of a live giant squid—described as "the most elusive image in natural history"—were mooted since at least the 1960s. Efforts intensified significantly towards the end of the century, with the launch of several multi-million-dollar expeditions in the late 1990s, though these were all unsuccessful. The first years of the 21st century saw a number of breakthroughs in live giant squid imaging that ultimately culminated in the first recordings of live animals (#548 and 549) in their natural deep-water habitat—from both a remote camera system and a manned submersible—in July 2012. Despite these recent advances and the growing number of both specimens and recordings of live animals, the species continues to occupy a unique place in the public imagination. As Roper et al. (2015:83) wrote: "Few events in the natural world stimulate more excitement and curiosity among scientists and laymen alike than the discovery of a specimen of Architeuthis."

Distribution patterns 

The genus Architeuthis has a cosmopolitan or bi-subtropical distribution, and carcasses are known to wash ashore on every continent except Antarctica. The greatest numbers of specimens have been recorded in: the North Atlantic around Newfoundland (historically), northern Spain (more recently), Norway, the northern British Isles, and the archipelagos of the Azores and Madeira; the South Atlantic off South Africa and Namibia; the northwestern Pacific off Japan (especially more recently); and the southwestern Pacific around New Zealand and Australia.

The vast majority of specimens are of oceanic origin, including marginal seas broadly open to adjacent ocean, especially the Tasman Sea and Sea of Japan, but also the Gulf of Mexico and Caribbean Sea, among others. A handful are known from the far western Mediterranean Sea (#383, 447, 498, and 550), but these records do not necessarily indicate that the Mediterranean falls within the natural range of the giant squid, as the specimens may have been transported there by inflowing Atlantic water. Similarly, giant squid are unlikely to naturally occur in the North Sea owing to its shallow depth (but see #107 and 113, the only known English strandings). They are generally absent from equatorial and high polar latitudes (but see #215 and 249 from equatorial Atlantic waters, and specimens from northern Norway or #102 from the edge of the Arctic Circle off western Greenland).

Total number of specimens 
According to Guerra et al. (2006), 592 confirmed giant squid specimens were known as of the end of 2004. Of these, 306 came from the Atlantic Ocean, 264 from the Pacific Ocean, 20 from the Indian Ocean, and 2 from the Mediterranean Sea. The figures for specimens collected in the Atlantic and Pacific Oceans further broke down as follows: 148 in the northeastern Atlantic, 126 in the northwestern Atlantic, 26 in the southeastern Atlantic, 6 in the southwestern Atlantic, 43 in the northeastern Pacific, 28 in the northwestern Pacific, 10 in the southeastern Pacific, and 183 in the southwestern Pacific.

Guerra & González (2009) reported that the total number of recorded giant squid specimens stood at 624. Guerra et al. (2011) gave an updated figure of 677 specimens (see table below). Paxton (2016a) put the total at around 700 as of 2015, of which  460 had been measured in some way. This number has increased substantially in recent years, with 57 specimens recorded from the Sea of Japan over an extraordinary 15-month period in 2014–2015 (beginning with #563). The giant squid nevertheless remains a rarely encountered animal, especially considering its wide distribution and large size, with Richard Ellis writing that "each giant squid that washes up or is taken from the stomach of a sperm whale is still an occasion for a teuthological celebration".

* Underestimates according to Guerra et al. (2011)
** Includes records from Durban, South Africa

Procurement, preservation, and display 
Preserved giant squid specimens are much sought after for both study and display. In the mid-1960s, marine biologist and giant squid expert Frederick Aldrich of the Memorial University of Newfoundland organised a "squid squad" with the intent of securing specimens for study. In the 1980s, Aldrich resorted to distributing eye-catching "Wanted" posters offering rewards for "finding and holding" specimens stranded on the Newfoundland coast, "the value being dependent on their condition". Aldrich (1991:459) wrote that "[s]uch efforts were not futile, for in the intervening years I have secured either the specimens or information on 15 animals", though according to Hoff (2003:85) the rewards went unclaimed.

Guerra et al. (2011:1990) estimated that around 30 giant squid were exhibited at museums and aquaria worldwide, while Guerra & Segonzac (2014:118–119) provided an updated list of 35 (21 in national museums and 14 in private institutions; see table below). The purpose-built Museo del Calamar Gigante in Luarca, Spain, had by far the largest collection on public display (4 females and 1 male), but many of the museum's 14 or so total specimens were destroyed during a storm on 2 February 2014. At least 13 specimens were exhibited in Japan as of February 2017, of which 10 had been acquired since 2013.

A number of fragmentary giant squid remains were displayed as part of "In Search of Giant Squid", a Smithsonian travelling exhibition curated by Clyde Roper that visited a dozen US museums and other educational institutions between September 2004 and August 2009. The exhibition opened its national tour at Yale University's Peabody Museum of Natural History, which has maintained a strong association with the giant squid from the time of the Newfoundland strandings in the 1870s. Preparations for the Peabody exhibition, overseen by site curator Eric Lazo-Wasem, uncovered giant squid material in the museum's collections that was not previously known to be extant, including original specimens from Addison Emery Verrill's time.

In the late 19th century, the giant squid's popular appeal and desirability to museums—but scarcity of preserved specimens—spawned a long tradition of "life-sized" models that continues to the present day. Verrill's description of the famous Catalina specimen of 1877 (#42), which he personally examined in New York City the same year, served as the basis for the earliest models. The second Portugal Cove specimen, from 1881 (#60), was probably also used as a reference, as it was seen by Verrill shortly before he began modelling. Following Verrill's design, his draughtsman James Henry Emerton built the very first giant squid model for the Peabody Museum of Natural History in 1883. A second, near-identical model was soon delivered to the Museum of Comparative Zoology at Harvard University, and a third was made for the International Fisheries Exhibition, held in London in 1883. The Verrill and Emerton models were followed by six similar examples, again based on the Catalina specimen, produced by Ward's Natural Science Establishment of Rochester, New York, of which two were sold internationally: to London's Natural History Museum and the Oceanographic Museum of Monaco. The original Peabody Museum model was discarded around 1964 and replaced two years later by one based on both the Logy Bay specimen of 1873 (#30) and on several Newfoundland specimens from the 1960s.

More recently, alternative preservation methods such as plastination have made it possible to display real giant squid specimens in a dry state, without the need for alcohol or formaldehyde. A giant squid was first plastinated in 2000 and this specimen has been on display at the Muséum national d'histoire naturelle in Paris since 2008 (#429); two further specimens were plastinated in 2004. Several other individuals have been prepared for display by more conventional drying methods, such as hard curing (e.g. #598, 603, and 617).

Reported sizes 

Giant squid size—long a subject of both popular debate and academic inquiry—has often been misreported and exaggerated. Reports of specimens reaching or even exceeding  in total length are widespread, but no animals approaching this size have been scientifically documented in recent times, despite the hundreds of specimens available for study. It is now thought likely that such lengths were achieved by great lengthening of the two long feeding tentacles, analogous to stretching elastic bands, or resulted from inadequate measurement methods such as pacing.

Of the nearly 100 specimens examined by Clyde Roper, the largest was "46 feet (14 m) long". McClain et al. (2015) regard a  specimen from Asturias, Spain (#480), as the "longest scientifically verified" and "largest recorded and well-preserved specimen in the contemporary, peer-reviewed literature". Charles G. M. Paxton performed a statistical analysis using literature records of giant squid specimens and concluded that "squid with a conservative TL of  would seem likely based on current data", but the study has been heavily criticised by experts in the field.

O'Shea & Bolstad (2008) give a maximum mantle length (ML) of  based on the examination of more than 130 specimens, as well as beaks recovered from sperm whales (which do not exceed the size of those found in the largest complete specimens), though there are recent scientific records of specimens that slightly exceed this size (such as #371, a  ML female captured off Tasmania, Australia; see also #647, with an estimated 2.15–3.06 m ML). Questionable records of up to  ML can be found in older literature.

Including the head and arms but excluding the tentacles (standard length), the species very rarely exceeds  according to O'Shea & Bolstad (2008). Paxton (2016a) considers  to be the greatest reliably measured SL, based on a specimen (#46) reported by Verrill (1880a:192), and considers specimens of  SL or more to be "very probable", but these conclusions have been criticised by giant squid experts.

Discredited weights of as much as a tonne or more are not uncommon in older literature (see e.g. #22, 114, and 117).

The giant squid and the distantly related colossal squid (Mesonychoteuthis hamiltoni) are recognised as having by far the largest eyes of any living animal, and comparable to the largest eyes known from the fossil record. Historical reports of "dinner plate–sized" eyes (e.g. #37) are largely corroborated by modern measurements, with an accepted maximum diameter of at least  and a  pupil (based on #248).

Species identifications 

The taxonomy of the giant squid genus Architeuthis has not been entirely resolved. Lumpers and splitters may propose as many as eight species or as few as one, with most authors recognising either one cosmopolitan species (A. dux) or three geographically disparate species: A. dux from the Atlantic, A. martensi from the North Pacific, and A. sanctipauli from the Southern Ocean. Historically, some twenty species names (not counting new combinations) and eight genus names have been applied to architeuthids (see Type specimens). No genetic or physical basis for distinguishing between the named species has been proposed, though specimens from the North Pacific do not appear to reach the maximum dimensions seen in giant squid from other areas. There may also be regional differences in the relative proportions of the tentacles and their sucker counts. The mitogenomic analysis of Winkelmann et al. (2013) supports the existence of a single, globally distributed species (A. dux). The same conclusion was reached by Förch (1998) on the basis of morphological data.

The literature on giant squid has been further muddied by the frequent misattribution of various squid specimens to the genus Architeuthis, often based solely on their large size. In the academic literature alone, such misidentifications encompass at least the oegopsid families Chiroteuthidae (misidentification #[8]—Asperoteuthis lui), Cranchiidae (#[5] and [6]—Mesonychoteuthis hamiltoni), Ommastrephidae (#[1]—Sthenoteuthis pteropus and #[2]—Dosidicus gigas), Onychoteuthidae (#[7], [11], and [13]—Onykia robusta), and Psychroteuthidae (#[4]—indeterminate species), with the familial identity of one record remaining unresolved (#[3]). Many more misidentifications have been propagated in the popular press, involving—among others—Megalocranchia cf. fisheri (#[12]; Cranchiidae), Thysanoteuthis rhombus (#[10]; Thysanoteuthidae), and an egg mass of Nototodarus gouldi (#[9]; Ommastrephidae). This situation is further confused by the occasional usage of the common name 'giant squid' in reference to large squids of other genera.

List of giant squid

Sourcing and progenitors 

The present list generally follows "Records of Architeuthis Specimens from Published Reports", compiled by zoologist Michael J. Sweeney of the Smithsonian Institution and including records through 1999, with additional information taken from other sources (see Full citations). While Sweeney's list is sourced almost entirely from the scientific literature, many of the more recent specimens are supported by reports from the news media, including newspapers and magazines, radio and television broadcasts, and online sources.

Earlier efforts to compile a list of all known giant squid encounters throughout history include those of marine writer and artist Richard Ellis. Ellis's first list, published as an appendix to his 1994 work Monsters of the Sea, was probably the first such compilation to appear in print and was described in the book's table of contents as "the most complete and accurate list of the historical sightings and strandings of Architeuthis ever attempted". Ellis's much-expanded second list, an appendix to his 1998 book The Search for the Giant Squid, comprised 166 entries spanning four and a half centuries, from 1545 to 1996. Records which appear in Ellis's 1998 list but are not found in Sweeney & Roper's 2001 list have a citation to Ellis (1998a)—in the page range 257–265—in the 'Additional references' column of the main table.

In addition to these global specimen lists, a number of regional compilations have been published, including Clarke & Robson (1929:156), Rees (1950:39–40) and Collins (1998) for the British Isles; Sivertsen (1955) for Norway; Aldrich (1991) for Newfoundland; Okiyama (1993) for the Sea of Japan; Förch (1998:105–110) for New Zealand; Guerra et al. (2006:258–259) for Asturias, Spain; [TMAG] (2007:18–21) for Tasmania, Australia; and Roper et al. (2015) for the western North Atlantic. Works exhaustively enumerating all recorded specimens from a particular mass appearance event include those of Verrill (1882c) for Newfoundland in 1870–1881 and Kubodera et al. (2016) for the Sea of Japan in 2014–2015. Though the number of authenticated giant squid records now runs into the hundreds, individual specimens still generate considerable scientific interest and continue to have scholarly papers unto themselves.

Scope and inclusion criteria 
The list includes records of giant squid (genus Architeuthis) either supported by a physical specimen (or parts thereof) or—in the absence of any saved material—where at least one of the following conditions is satisfied: the specimen was examined by an expert prior to disposal and thereby positively identified as a giant squid; a photograph or video recording of the specimen was taken, on the basis of which it was assigned to the genus Architeuthis by a recognised authority; or the record was accepted as being that of a giant squid by a contemporary expert or later authority for any other reason, such as the perceived credibility of the source or the verisimilitude of the account.

Purported sightings of giant squid lacking both physical and documentary evidence and expert appraisal are generally excluded, with the exception of those appearing in the lists of Ellis (1994a:379–384), Ellis (1998a:257–265), or Sweeney & Roper (2001) (see e.g. "attacks" of #32 and 106).  In particular, "sea monster" sightings—many of which have been attributed to giant squid by various authors—fall short of this standard. Compositing and other forms of photo manipulation have been used to perpetrate hoaxes involving giant squid and these are occasionally circulated as records of actual news events, often accompanied by fictional background stories. Such records are likewise excluded, as are speculative misidentifications with no scientific basis.

The earliest surviving records of very large squid date to classical antiquity and the writings of Aristotle, Pliny the Elder, and possibly Antipater of Sidon. But in the absence of detailed descriptions or surviving remains, it is not possible to assign these to the giant squid genus Architeuthis with any confidence, and they are therefore not included in this list (in any case, giant squid records from the Mediterranean are exceedingly rare). Basque and Portuguese cod fishermen observed what were likely giant squid carcasses in the waters of the Grand Banks of Newfoundland as early as the 16th century, but conclusive evidence is similarly lacking. The earliest specimens identifiable as true giant squid are generally accepted to be ones from the early modern period in the 17th and 18th centuries, and possibly as far back as the 16th century (#1).

All developmental stages from hatchling to mature adult are included. In the literature there is a single anecdotal account of a giant squid "egg case", but this is excluded due to a lack of substantiating evidence (see misidentification #[9] for possible egg mass later determined to be that of the arrow squid, Nototodarus gouldi). Indirect evidence of giant squid—such as sucker scars found on sperm whales—falls outside the scope of this list.

Specimens misassigned to the genus Architeuthis in print publications or news reports are included, but are clearly highlighted as misidentifications.

List of specimens 
Records are listed chronologically in ascending order and numbered accordingly. This numbering is not meant to be definitive but rather to provide a convenient means of referring to individual records. Specimens incorrectly assigned to the genus Architeuthis are counted separately, their numbers enclosed in square brackets, and are highlighted in pink. Records that cover multiple whole specimens, or remains necessarily originating from multiple individuals (e.g. two lower beaks), have the 'Material cited' cell highlighted in grey. Animals that were photographed or filmed while alive (all from the 21st century) have the 'Nature of encounter' cell highlighted in yellow. Where a record falls into more than one of these categories, a combination of shadings is used. Where an image of a specimen is available, this is indicated by a camera symbol (📷) that links to the image.

 Date – Date on which the specimen was first captured, found, or observed. Where this is unknown, the date on which the specimen was first reported is listed instead and noted as such. All times are local.
 Location – Area where the specimen was encountered, including coordinates and depth information where available. Given as it appears in the cited reference(s), except where additional information is provided in square brackets. The quadrant of a major ocean in which the specimen was found is given in curly brackets (e.g. {NEA}; see Oceanic sectors).
  – Circumstances in which the specimen was recovered or observed. Given as they appear in the cited reference(s), although "washed ashore" encompasses all stranded animals.
 Identification – Species- or genus-level taxon to which the specimen was assigned. Given as it appears in the cited reference(s). Listed chronologically if specimen was re-identified. These designations are primarily of historical interest as most authorities now recognise a single species of giant squid: Architeuthis dux. Where only a vernacular name has been applied to the specimen (e.g. "giant squid" or a non-English equivalent), this is given instead.
  – Original specimen material that was recovered or observed. "Entire" encompasses all more-or-less complete specimens. Names of anatomical features are retained from original sources (e.g. "jaws" may be given instead of the preferred "beak", or "body" instead of "mantle"). The specimen's state of preservation is also given, where known, and any missing parts enumerated (the tentacles, arm tips, reddish skin and eyes are the parts most often missing in stranded specimens, owing to their delicate nature and/or preferential targeting by scavengers).
 Material saved – Material that was kept after examination and not discarded (if any). Information may be derived from outdated sources; material may no longer be extant even if stated as such.
 Sex – Sex and sexual maturity of the specimen.
 Size and measurements – Data relating to measurements and counts. Abbreviations used are based on standardised acronyms in teuthology (see Measurements), with the exception of several found in older references. Measurements are given as they appear in the cited reference(s), with both arithmetic precision and original units preserved (metric conversions are shown alongside imperial measurements), though some of the more extreme lengths and weights found in older literature have since been discredited.
 Repository – Institution in which the specimen material is deposited (based on cited sources; may not be current), including accession numbers where available. Institutional acronyms are those defined by Leviton et al. (1985) and Leviton & Gibbs (1988) (see Repositories). Where the acronym is unknown, the full repository name is listed. Type specimens, such as holotypes or syntypes, are identified as such in boldface. If an author has given a specimen a unique identifying number (e.g. Verrill specimen No. 28), this is included as well, whether or not the specimen is extant.
 Main references – The most important sources, typically ones that provide extensive data and/or analysis on a particular specimen (often primary sources). Presented in author–date parenthetical referencing style, with page numbers included where applicable (those in square brackets refer either to unpaginated works or English translations of originally non-English works; see Full citations). Only the first page of relevant coverage is given, except where this is discontinuous. Any relevant figures ("figs.") and plates ("pls.") are enumerated.
  – References of lesser importance or primacy, either because they provide less substantive information on a given record (often secondary sources), or else because they are not easily obtainable or possibly even extant (e.g. old newspaper articles, personal correspondence, and television broadcasts) but nonetheless mentioned in more readily accessible published works (see Full citations).
 Notes – Miscellaneous information, often including persons and vessels involved in the specimen's recovery and subsequent handling, and any dissections, preservation work or scientific analyses carried out on the specimen. Where animals have been recorded while alive this is also noted. Material not referable to the genus Architeuthis, as well as specimens on public display, are both highlighted in bold (as "Non-architeuthid" and "On public display", respectively), though the latter information may no longer be current.

Additionally, 13 records relate to specimens misidentified as giant squid (indicated in pink).

Type specimens 
The following table lists the nominal species-level taxa associated with the genus Architeuthis, together with their corresponding type specimens, type localities, and type repositories. Binomial names are listed alphabetically by specific epithet and presented in their original combinations.

Abbreviations 
The following abbreviations are used in the List of giant squid table.

Oceanic sectors 

Oceanic sectors used in the main table follow Sweeney & Roper (2001): the Atlantic Ocean is divided into sectors at the equator and 30°W, the Pacific Ocean is divided at the equator and 180°, and the Indian Ocean is defined as the range 20°E to 115°E (the Arctic and Southern Oceans are not distinguished). An additional category has been created to accommodate the handful of specimens recorded from the Mediterranean Sea.

 NEA, Northeast Atlantic Ocean
 NWA, Northwest Atlantic Ocean
 SEA, Southeast Atlantic Ocean
 SWA, Southwest Atlantic Ocean
 NEP, Northeast Pacific Ocean
 NWP, Northwest Pacific Ocean
 SEP, Southeast Pacific Ocean
 SWP, Southwest Pacific Ocean
 NIO, Northern Indian Ocean
 SIO, Southern Indian Ocean
 MED, Mediterranean Sea

Measurements 

Abbreviations used for measurements and counts follow Sweeney & Roper (2001) and are based on standardised acronyms in teuthology, primarily those defined by Roper & Voss (1983), with the exception of several found in older references. Following Sweeney & Roper (2001), the somewhat non-standard EL ("entire" length) and WL ("whole" length) are used in place of the more common TL (usually total length; here tentacle length) and SL (usually standard length; here spermatophore length), respectively.

 AC, arm circumference (AC(I), AC(II), AC(III) and AC(IV) refer to measurements of specific arm pairs)
 AD, arm diameter (AD(I), AD(II), AD(III) and AD(IV) refer to measurements of specific arm pairs)
 AF, arm formula
 AL, arm length (AL(I), AL(II), AL(III) and AL(IV) refer to measurements of specific arm pairs)
 ASC, arm sucker count
 ASD, arm sucker diameter
 BAC, buccal apparatus circumference
 BAL, buccal apparatus length
 BC, body circumference (assumed to mean greatest circumference of mantle unless otherwise specified)
 BD, body diameter (assumed to mean greatest diameter of mantle)
 BL, body length (usually equivalent to mantle length, as head length is often given separately)
 CaL, carpus length
 CL, club length (usually refers to expanded portion at the apex of tentacle)
 CSC, club sucker count
 CSD, club sucker diameter (usually largest) [usually equivalent to LSD]
 CW, club width
 DC, dactylus club length
 EC, egg count
 ED, egg diameter
 EL, "entire" length (end of tentacle(s), often stretched, to posterior tip of tail; in contrast to WL, measured from end of arms to posterior tip of tail)
 EyD, eye diameter
 EyOD, eye orbit diameter
 FL, fin length
 FuCL, funnel cartilage length
 FuCW, funnel cartilage width
 FuD, funnel opening diameter
 FuL, funnel length
 FW, fin width
 GiL, gill length
 GL, gladius (pen) length
 GW, gladius (pen) width
 G(W), daily growth rate (%)
 HC, head circumference
 HeL, hectocotylus length
 HL, head length (most often base of arms to edge of mantle)
 HW, head width
 LAL, longest arm length
 LRL, lower rostral length of beak
 LSD, largest sucker diameter (on tentacle club) [usually equivalent to CSD]
 MaL, manus length
 ML, dorsal mantle length (used only where stated as such)
 MT, mantle thickness
 MW, maximum mantle width (used only where stated as such)
 NGL, nidamental gland length
 PL, penis length
 RaL, radula length
 RaW, radula width
 RL, rachis length
 RW, rachis width
 SInc, number of statolith increments
 SL, spermatophore length
 SoA, spermatophores on arms
 SSD, stalk sucker diameter
 SSL, spermatophore sac length
 TaL, tail length
 TC, tentacle circumference (most often of tentacle stalk)
 TCL, tentacle club length
 TD, tentacle diameter (most often of tentacle stalk)
 TL, tentacle length
 TSC, tentacle sucker count (club and stalk combined)
 TSD, tentacle sucker diameter (usually largest)
 URL, upper rostral length of beak
 VML, ventral mantle length
 WL, "whole" length (end of arms, often damaged, to posterior tip of tail; in contrast to EL, measured from end of tentacles to posterior tip of tail)
 WT, weight

Repositories 

Institutional acronyms follow Sweeney & Roper (2001) and are primarily those defined by Leviton et al. (1985), Leviton & Gibbs (1988), and Sabaj (2016). Where the acronym is unknown, the full repository name is listed.

 AMNH, American Museum of Natural History, New York City, New York, United States
 AMS, Australian Museum, Sydney, New South Wales, Australia
 BAMZ, Bermuda Aquarium, Museum and Zoo, Flatts Village, Bermuda
 BMNH, Natural History Museum, Cromwell Road, London, England (formerly British Museum (Natural History))
 CEPESMA, Museo-Aula del Mar, Coordinadora para el Estudio y la Protección de las Especies Marinas, Luarca, Spain
 EI, Essex Institute, Salem, Massachusetts, United States
 FOSJ, Department of Fisheries and Oceans, St. John's, Newfoundland, Canada
 ICM, Instituto de Ciencias del Mar, Barcelona, Spain
 MCNOPM, Museo de Ciencias Naturales de Puerto Madryn (Museum of Natural Sciences and Oceanography), Puerto Madryn, Argentina
 MHNLR, Muséum national d'histoire naturelle, La Rochelle, France
 MHNN, Muséum national d'histoire naturelle (Musee Barla), Nice, France
 MMF, Museu Municipal do Funchal, Funchal, Madeira
 MNHN, Muséum national d'histoire naturelle, Paris, France
 MOM, Musée Océanographique, Monaco
 MUDB, Department of Biology, Memorial University, Newfoundland, Canada
 NIWA, National Institute of Water and Atmospheric Research, Wellington, New Zealand
 NMI, National Museum of Ireland – Natural History, Dublin, Ireland
 NMML, National Marine Mammal Laboratory, Alaska Fisheries Science Center, Seattle, Washington, United States
 NMNH, National Museum of Natural History, Smithsonian Institution, Washington, District of Columbia, United States
 NMNZ, Museum of New Zealand Te Papa Tongarewa, Wellington, New Zealand (formerly Colonial Museum; Dominion Museum)
 NMSJ, Newfoundland Museum, St. John's, Newfoundland, Canada
 NMSZ, National Museum of Scotland, Zoology Department, Edinburgh, Scotland (formerly Royal Museum of Scotland; formerly Royal Scottish Museum, Edinburgh)
 NMV, Museum Victoria, Melbourne, Victoria, Australia (formerly National Museum of Victoria)
 NSMC, Nova Scotia Museum, Halifax, Canada
 PASS, Peabody Academy of Science, Salem, Massachusetts, United States (now in Peabody Museum of Salem?)
 RMNH, Naturalis Biodiversity Center, Leiden, Netherlands
 RSMAS, Rosenstiel School of Marine and Atmospheric Science, Miami, Florida, United States (= UMML, University of Miami Marine Lab)
 SAM, Iziko South African Museum, Cape Town, South Africa
 SAMA, South Australian Museum, North Terrace, Adelaide, Australia
 SBMNH, Santa Barbara Museum of Natural History, Santa Barbara, California, United States
 SMNH, Swedish Museum of Natural History, Stockholm, Sweden
 TMAG, Tasmanian Museum and Art Gallery, Hobart, Tasmania, Australia
 VSM, NTNU Museum of Natural History and Archaeology, Trondheim, Norway (formerly Det Kgl. Norske Videnskabers Selskab Museet)
 YPM, Peabody Museum of Natural History, Yale University, New Haven, Connecticut, United States
 ZMB, Zoologisches Museum, Museum für Naturkunde der Humboldt University of Berlin, Berlin, Germany
 ZMMGU, Zoological Museum, Lomonosov Moscow State University, Moscow, Russia
 ZMUB, Universitetet i Bergen, Bergen, Norway
 ZMUC, Kobenhavns Universitet, Zoologisk Museum, Copenhagen, Denmark

Specimen images 
The following images relate to pre–20th century giant squid specimens and sightings. The number below each image corresponds to that given in the List of giant squid table and is linked to the relevant record therein. The date on which the specimen was first documented is also given (the little-endian day/month/year date format is used throughout).

Notes

References

Short citations

Full citations

A

B

C

D

E

F

G

H

I

J

K

L

M

N

O

P

Q

R

S

T

U

V

W

Y

Z

Author unknown 

 
 
 
 
 
 
 
 
 
 
 
 
 
 
 
 
 
 
 
 
 
 
 
 
 
 
 
 
 
 

Giant squid
Lists of animal specimens